= São José, Porto Alegre =

Neighbourhood in Porto Alegre, Brazil

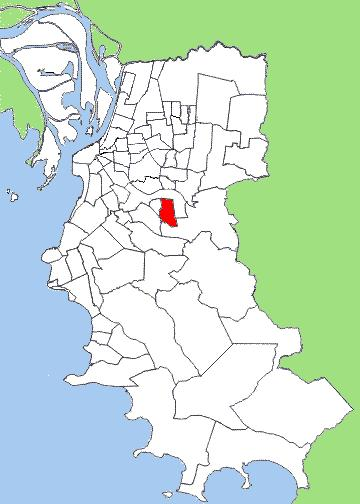

São José is a neighbourhood (bairro) in the city of Porto Alegre, the state capital of Rio Grande do Sul, in Brazil. It was created by Law 2022 from December 7, 1959.
